Sestri Levante is a town and comune in the Metropolitan City of Genoa, Liguria, Italy. While nearby Portofino and the Cinque Terre are probably the best-known tourist destinations on the Italian Riviera, Sestri Levante has become popular among Italians. This once quiet fishing village has slowly turned into a tourist hotspot, developing an old and a new town.

Geography 
Sestri Levante is found approximately halfway between Genoa and La Spezia. The town has two bays: Baia delle Favole, (Bay of the Fables), and Baia del Silenzio, the (Bay of Silence). The original part of Sestri Levante is actually on a peninsula, with the Baia del Silenzio (also known as "Portobello") on one side and Baia delle Favole on the other. Baia delle Favole or “Bay of Fairy Tales” was named in honor of Danish writer, Hans Christian Andersen, who lived in Sestri Levante for a short time in 1833.

History 
Sestri Levante has its origins as an ancient maritime and merchant center. Originally a small island with a promontory, it was later connected to the mainland. In Roman times, it was known as Segesta Tigullorum (or Tigulliorum) or simply Segesta, but the place was nearly abandoned when the Roman empire collapsed. It seems to have belonged to the Ligurian tribe of the Tigullii. It was mentioned again in the year 909 in a certificate of Berengar I of Italy, in which part of its territory was ceded to the basilica di San Giovanni di Pavia. During the Middle Ages, Sestri Levante began to expand, probably giving the fortress appearance that is due to the terrain.

In 1133, the noble family of Lavagna, the Fieschi, attacked Tigullio, the gulf in which Sestri Levante is located, however, they were fought off by the powerful Republic of Genoa, and therefore, Sestri Levante became a part of the republic, for military protection. In the year 1145, the abbey of San Colombano was acquired by the Genoese, and was transformed later into a castle.

In 1170, Sestri Levante was attacked by a naval flotilla from Pisa, but was able to withstand the attack.

Economy
Cantiere navale di Riva Trigoso is a shipyard founded in 1897 by Erasmo Piaggio in Riva Trigoso, it mostly built commercial ships. In 1925, the Piaggio heirs decided to spin off the drydock business and the company was renamed Cantieri del Tirreno. It diversified into building warships and was heavily damaged during World War II. The shipyard was merged into Italcantieri in 1973 and then into Fincantieri in 1984.

Sport
Sestri Levante is home to football club U.S.D. Sestri Levante 1919, which plays Serie D Group A for the 2020-2021 season. The club has mostly competed in regional level Italian competitions, with three seasons in Serie C from 1946–1949. Its home ground is the Stadio Giuseppe Sivori.

Cultural depictions
 Sestri Levante is mentioned by Dante Alighieri (as "Siestri") in Canto 19 of The Divine Comedy.
 "Sestri Levante" is also a song by Australian band Tame Impala, and appeared on their album Live Versions.
 Depiction in Rome: Total War. In the 2004 PC video game Rome: Total War, capturing Segesta (Sestri Levante) will always be the first mission the player receives if they have chosen to play as the Julii faction. The conquest of the city is thus often seen as a first step towards the expansion of the Republic by the player.

Twin towns and sister cities
Sestri Levante is twinned with:
 Dole, France
 Santa Cruz, United States

Notable people 
 Bruno Baveni, footballer
 Ermes Paterlini, retired footballer

Gallery

References

External links

Official website

Cities and towns in Liguria